The Bobby Limb Show was an early Australian television music/variety series which aired from 1959 to 1961, and was later re-titled (with minor format changes) as The Mobil-Limb Show from 1961 to 1964. It was hosted by Bobby Limb, and was produced by the Nine Network's TCN-9. Episodes included music, dancing, and comedy sketches.

Regulars in The Bobby Limb Show included Limb's wife Dawn Lake, Buster Fiddess, Johnny O'Connor, The Delltones, Tikky Taylor, and The Bobby Limb Show Band.

Regular guests in The Mobil-Limb Show included Leonard Teale, Gaynor Bunning, and Noel Brophy.  Many episodes of both series exist as kinescope recordings

References

External links
 

1959 Australian television series debuts
1964 Australian television series endings
Black-and-white Australian television shows
English-language television shows
Australian variety television shows
Nine Network original programming
Australian comedy television series
Australian live television series